Naiin (read Nai-in) is a Thai bookstore chain owned by Amarin Printing and Publishing Ltd., a publisher in Thailand producing paperbacks and magazines. Its first branch, at Tha Phra Chan near Thammasat University, has been operating since 1994. As of February 2005, there are 71 branches (including franchises) of Naiin bookstore in Thailand plus one franchise branch in San Francisco. The bookstore provides a website in Thai.

External links

 www.naiin.com
 www.amarin.com

Bookshops of Thailand